Señorita República Dominicana 1977.   There was no pageant or competition in this edition.  Miss Dominican Republic 1977 was an administrative designation by The  Dominican Tourist Office.  Blanca Aurora Sardiñas was appointed to represent the country  at the Miss Universe 1977 which was held at the National Theater in  Santo Domingo Dominican Republic.

External links
 https://web.archive.org/web/20090211102742/http://ogm.elcaribe.com.do/ogm/consulta.aspx

Miss Dominican Republic
1977 beauty pageants
1977 in the Dominican Republic